Shikhovo is a rural locality (a village) in Zadneselskoye Rural Settlement, Ust-Kubinsky District, Vologda Oblast, Russia. The population was 19 as of 2002.

Geography 
Shikhovo is located 21 km northwest of Ustye (the district's administrative centre) by road. Stafilovo is the nearest rural locality.

References 

Rural localities in Ust-Kubinsky District